Bikzyan (Bikyän) is a rural locality (a village) in Burayevsky Selsoviet, Burayevsky District, Bashkortostan, Russia. The population was 183 as of 2010. There are w streets.

Geography 
Bikzyan is located 3 km north of Burayevo (the district's administrative centre) by road. Burayevo is the nearest rural locality.

References 

Rural localities in Burayevsky District